Fritze Wulff Carstensen (née Nathansen, 18 July 1925 – 5 August 2005) was a Danish freestyle swimmer. She won two European titles in 1947 and was part of the Danish 4×100 m relay team that won a silver medal at the 1948 Summer Olympics, where she placed seventh-eighth in her individual 100 m and 400 m events.

References

1925 births
2005 deaths
Danish female freestyle swimmers
Olympic swimmers of Denmark
Swimmers at the 1948 Summer Olympics
Olympic silver medalists for Denmark
Medalists at the 1948 Summer Olympics
European Aquatics Championships medalists in swimming
Sportspeople from Aarhus
Olympic silver medalists in swimming